Therese Gunnarsson (born November 30, 1983), nicknamed "The Gun", is a Swedish professional Muay Thai fighter. She started training kickboxing in 2004, but switched to Muay Thai in 2010. She has won both the WAKO Pro title, and the world amateur kickboxing championship. She is the first and only Swedish fighter to accomplish this.

In February 2014, Gunnarsson made her professional boxing debut against Sonja Soknic. She won the bout by KO late in the first round.

Championships and awards

Kickboxing
WAKO
2013 - Swedish K1 Championship 
2013 - World K1 Championship 
2012 - Swedish Kickboxing Championship 
2012 - Pro K1 World Kickboxing Championship, 52 kg 
2011 - World Kickboxing Championship K1-rules 
2010 - Swedish Kickboxing Championship 
2009 - Swedish Kickboxing Championship 
2009 - World Kickboxing Highkick Championship 
2009 - World Kickboxing Lowkick Championship 
2008 - Swedish Kickboxing Championship 
2008 - European Kickboxing Championship, 48 kg 
2007 - Swedish Kickboxing Championship 
2006 - European Kickboxing Championship, 50 kg 
2006 - Swedish Kickboxing Championship

Muay Thai
IFMA
2017 World Muay Thai Championship 
2017 Swedish Muay Thai Championship 
2016 Swedish Muay Thai Championship 
2015 Swedish Muay Thai Championship 
2015 Royal World Cup Muay Thai Championship 
2014 Nordic Muay Thai Championship, 52 kg 
2010 Nordic Muay Thai Championship  
2010 Swedish Muay Thai Championship

Boxing
AIBA
2012 - Swedish Boxing Championship 
2010 - Swedish Boxing Championship

Kickboxing and Muay Thai record

|-  style="background:#fbb;"
| 2017-04-01 || Loss ||align=left| Iman Barlow || Muay Thai Grand Prix 7: Indigo at the O2 || London, England || TKO (knees to the body) || 5 || 1:40 || 
|-
! style=background:white colspan=9 |
|-  style="background:#fbb;"
| 2016-06-24 || Loss ||align=left| Anissa Meksen || Monte Carlo Fighting Masters || Monte Carlo, Monaco || Decision (unanimous) || 5 || 3:00 || 
|-
! style=background:white colspan=9 |
|-  style="background:#cfc;"
| 2016-04-15 || Win ||align=left| Alexandra Jursová || Clash of Titans || Plzen, Czech Republic || TKO (elbows and punches) || 3 ||  || 
|-
|-  style="background:#fbb;"
| 2015-11-14 || Loss ||align=left| Josefine Lindgren Knutsson || Battle of Lund 7 || Lund, Sweden || Decision (unanimous) || 5 || 3:00 || 
|-
! style=background:white colspan=9 |
|-  style="background:#cfc;"
| 2015-04-25 || Win ||align=left| Anna Olsson || Gladiatorspelen 7: All In || Skövde, Sweden || Decision (unanimous) || 3 || 3:00 || 
|-
|-  style="background:#fbb;"
| 2015-03-00 || Loss ||align=left| Iman Barlow || Muay Thai event in England || Leicestershire, England || Decision (unanimous) || 5 || 3:00 || 
|-
|-  style="background:#cfc;"
| 2014-11-22 || Win ||align=left| Anne Line Hogstad || Westcoast Kickboxing || Gothenburg, Sweden || TKO ||  ||  || 
|-
|-  style="background:#cfc;"
| 2014-11-22 || Win ||align=left| Mirka Phetsangkhat || Westcoast Kickboxing || Gothenburg, Sweden || Decision (unanimous ) || 3 || 3:00 || 
|-
|-  style="background:#cfc;"
| 2014-09-20 || Win ||align=left| Ariana Santos || Battle of Lund 6 || Lund, Sweden || Decision (unanimous) || 3 || 3:00 || 
|-
! style=background:white colspan=9 |
|-  style="background:#fbb;"
| 2014-03-22 || Loss ||align=left| Mirka Phetsangkhat || Escape Fight Night || Helsinki, Finland || Points || 5 || 2:00 || 
|-
|-  style="background:#fbb;"
| 2013-11-02 || Loss ||align=left| Sofia Olofsson || West Coast Battle 5 || Varberg, Sweden || Decision (unanimous) || 3 || 3:00 || 
|-
|-  style="background:#fbb;"
| 2013-04-27 || Loss ||align=left| Fatima Pinto || Gladiatorspelen 5: Rising Star || Skövde, Sweden || Decision (unanimous) || 3 || 3:00 || 
|-
|-  style="background:#cfc;"
| 2012-11-17 || Win ||align=left| Yeliz Koblay || WAKO PRO Championships || Helsingborg, Sweden || Decision || 5 || 3:00 || 
|-
! style=background:white colspan=9 |
|-  style="background:#cfc;"
| 2012-05-26 || Win ||align=left| Marijeta Milic || Battle of Lund 4 || Lund, Sweden || Points || 3 || 3:00 || 
|-
|-  style="background:#cfc;"
| 2012-00-00 || Win ||align=left| Farinaz Lari || Kickboxing event in Macedonia || Macedonia || Decision || 3 || 3:00 || 
|-
|-
| colspan=9 | Legend:

Professional boxing record

References

External links
 Therese Gunnarsson Facebook Athlete Page
 Therese Gunnarsson Awakening Profile

1983 births
Living people
Swedish female kickboxers
Swedish Muay Thai practitioners
Female Muay Thai practitioners
People from Örkelljunga
Sportspeople from Skåne County